The Greek Cup Final, commonly referred to in Greece as just The Cup Final is the last match in the Greek Cup.

Teams in yellow background won both Panhellenic Championship (up to 1959) or Alpha Ethniki (up to 2006) or the Super League Greece (known as the "Super League") from 2006 through present and the Greek Cup in that season; this is known as The Double in Greek football.

Greek Cup Finals

Notes

Results by team

See also
Greek Football Cup
Hellenic Football Federation

References

External links
List of Greek Cup winners at RSSSF
Full results history at Hellenic Football Federation (epo.gr)

Greek Football Cup
 
Cup finals
Greek Cup